Flint Hill can refer to:

Places
In the United States
 Flint Hill, Georgia, an unincorporated community
 Flint Hill, Missouri, a town
 Flint Hill, Ralls County, Missouri, an unincorporated community
 Scottville, North Carolina, United States, formerly called Flint Hill
Flint Hill, Virginia (disambiguation), the name for multiple places in Virginia
Flint Hill School, in Virginia

Elsewhere
 Flint Hill, County Durham, England